The 1954 Paris–Tours was the 48th edition of the Paris–Tours cycle race and was held on 10 October 1954. The race started in Paris and finished in Tours. The race was won by Gilbert Scodeller.

General classification

References

1954 in French sport
1954
1954 Challenge Desgrange-Colombo
October 1954 sports events in Europe